Verdal Idrettslag is a Norwegian sports club from Verdalsøra, Nord-Trøndelag. It has sections for association football, team handball, weightlifting and speed skating.

It was established on 21 May 1920 as a merger between Værdalens SL, founded 12 December 1916, and FK Falken. The club counts 1916 as its founding year. In 1984 the track and field section formed its own club Verdal FIK.

Football
The men's football team currently plays in the Third Division, the fourth tier of Norwegian football. It contested a playoff to win promotion to the First Division in 1996, but failed. It last played in the Second Division in 2002. It then won its Third Division group and contested playoffs to the Second Division in 2006 and 2007, but failed both times.

In 2011 they signed former Tippeliga player Trond Viggo Toresen from Levanger FK, he played a role as Playing Coach along with Head Coach Nils Petter Austad. He proved to be an important figure in the battle for promotion to Second Division, which ended in a 3rd place and no promotion.

The women's football team played in the Norwegian Premier League in 1996 and 1997. In December 2004 the women's section started a cooperation team in the region, named Verdal FK. This was later disclosed after little success and internal disputes.

Recent history 
{|class="wikitable"
|-bgcolor="#efefef"
! Season
! 
! Pos.
! Pl.
! W
! D
! L
! GS
! GA
! P
!Cup
!Notes
|-
|2009
|D3
|align=right bgcolor=silver|2
|align=right|22||align=right|18||align=right|2||align=right|2
|align=right|74||align=right|25||align=right|56
||1st round
|
|-
|2010
|D3
|align=right |6
|align=right|22||align=right|12||align=right|1||align=right|9
|align=right|56||align=right|47||align=right|37
||1st round
|
|-
|2011 
|D3
|align=right bgcolor=cc9966|3
|align=right|26||align=right|16||align=right|5||align=right|5
|align=right|59||align=right|25||align=right|53
||2nd round 
|
|-
|2012 
|D3
|align=right bgcolor=cc9966|3
|align=right|26||align=right|13||align=right|8||align=right|5
|align=right|57||align=right|36||align=right|47
||2nd round
|
|-
|2013
|D3
| align="right" bgcolor=cc9966|3
| align="right" |26|| align="right" |14|| align="right" |6||align=right|6
| align="right" |55|| align="right" |35||align=right|48
||2nd qualifying round
|
|-
|2014 
|D3
| align="right" |5
| align="right" |26|| align="right" |13|| align="right" |2||align=right|11
| align="right" |61|| align="right" |57||align=right|41
||1st round
|
|-
|2015 
|D3
| align="right" |4
| align="right" |26|| align="right" |18|| align="right" |3||align=right|5
| align="right" |96|| align="right" |31||align=right|57
||1st qualifying round
|
|-
|2016 
|D3
| align="right" |4
| align="right" |26|| align="right" |15|| align="right" |5||align=right|6
| align="right" |72|| align="right" |41||align=right|50
||1st qualifying round
|
|-
|2017 (in progress)
|D3
| align="right" |3
| align="right" |16|| align="right" |7|| align="right" |5||align=right|4
| align="right" |28|| align="right" |20||align=right|26
||2nd round
|
|}

References

 Official site 

Football clubs in Norway
Sport in Trøndelag
Verdal
Association football clubs established in 1916
Defunct athletics clubs in Norway
1916 establishments in Norway